Düzqışlaq or Dyuz-Kyshlag or Dyuzkhshlak or Dyuzkyshlak may refer to:
 Düzqışlaq, Agstafa, Azerbaijan
 Düzqışlaq, Goranboy, Azerbaijan
 Düzqışlaq, Shamkir, Azerbaijan